, provisional designation , is a 970-meter asteroid and near-Earth object with the second smallest perihelion of any numbered asteroid (0.092 AU—38% of Mercury's orbital radius). With its high eccentricity, not only does  get very close to the Sun, but it also travels relatively far away from it. It has the third largest aphelion of any numbered Aten asteroid and is one of a small group of Aten asteroids that is also a Mars grazer. Its orbital elements indicate that it may be an extinct comet, but it hasn't been seen displaying cometary activity so far.

 was discovered by LINEAR in January 2000 and was soon after located by DANEOPS on Palomar plates from 10 February 1997. This allowed a reasonably precise orbit determination, and as a result it was spotted again on 27 February 2001 and 21 January 2002. When it was discovered, it beat 1995 CR's record for both asteroid with the smallest perihelion and for Aten asteroid with the highest eccentricity.

It is estimated that 's surface temperature reaches ~920 K at perihelion, enough to melt lead and zinc, and nearly enough to melt aluminium. The asteroid would be hot enough to incandesce red being above the Draper Point at closest approach.  is considered a good candidate for measuring the effects of Albert Einstein's general theory of relativity because of how close it comes to the Sun.

 shares noticeable orbit similarities with two other low-perihelion asteroids:  and 1995 CR, their longitude of perihelion differing by only 9.9 and 7.1 degrees, respectively. Combined with their similar semimajor axis (average distance from the Sun) of 0.877, 0.911, and 0.907 astronomical units respectively, they could possibly be fragments of  that separated from it in the past.

References

External links 
 MPEC 2000-C49
 
 
 

137924
137924
137924
137924
20000126